Noroxycodone is the major metabolite of the opioid analgesic oxycodone. It is formed from oxycodone in the liver via N-demethylation predominantly by CYP3A4. Noroxycodone binds to and activates the μ-opioid receptor (MOR) similarly to oxycodone, although with one-third of the affinity of oxycodone and 5- to 10-fold lower activational potency. However, although a potent MOR agonist, noroxycodone poorly crosses the blood-brain-barrier into the central nervous system, and for this reason, is only minimally analgesic in comparison.

See also 
 Norbuprenorphine
 Norbuprenorphine-3-glucuronide
 Norhydrocodone
 Normorphine
 Noroxymorphone

References 

4,5-Epoxymorphinans
Ketones
Opioid metabolites